Astra manufactures and operates launch vehicles for both commercial and military customers for launching satellites into orbit. The first of these orbital launch vehicles was labelled "Rocket 3".

Astra's first two rockets, Rocket 1.0 and Rocket 2.0 were suborbital test vehicles without payloads. Although their only launches were reported to be failures, Astra reported they were successful. Astra reached space (Karman line) for the first time on their second Rocket 3 launch (third if one counts in a previous rocket destroyed by fire on the launch pad), but the upper stage did not enter into orbit due to a wrong fuel and oxidizer mixture ratio. The company concluded that this met their goal for the mission and on their next flight they would fly a commercial payload. Astra's next flight on 28 August 2021 with their fourth Rocket 3 vehicle, Rocket 3.3 (LV0006) carrying a payload for the United States Space Force, failed to reach space after one of the engines failed 1 second after liftoff, but it did reach an altitude of 31 miles (50 kilometers).

On 20 November 2021 at 06:16:00, Astra Space launched its first successful mission to orbit. Rocket 3.3 (LV0007), carrying a demonstration payload from the US Department of Defense was launched from PSCA, after several unsuccessful launches during 2021 and 2020. The company's stocks surged by as much as 42% after this feat.

As of June 2022, there have been two successful launches (both orbital) out of a total of nine attempts (of which two were suborbital). In addition, a launch vehicle was destroyed during a pre-launch countdown dress rehearsal on 23 March 2020.

On 4 August 2022 during a quarterly briefing, Astra announced that after a string of failures leading to payload loss, Rocket 3.3 will be retired, and it will be replaced by the future Rocket 4.0 Launch Vehicle.

Future rocket variants currently in development include Rocket 4.0 (an upgraded version of Rocket 3) and Rocket 5.0 (a suborbital point-to-point delivery variant of Rocket 3.0).

Rocket 1 

Rocket 1 was a single test vehicle designed between October 2016, when Astra was formed, and March 2018 when the first launch window opened. This vehicle utilized five first stage "Delphin" engines. While second stage engine "Aether" was still being developed, an upper stage (second stage) mass simulator was used in its place. The exterior dimensions of this vehicle were similar to Rocket 3 due to the size limitation of fitting within a standard shipping container. A number of unsuccessful launch attempts were made between the initial window in March 2018 and July 2018 before the vehicle lifted off in July 2018. At the time, the company had been commonly referred to as "Stealth Space Company" in various media outlets.

Launch 
At approximately 22:00 UTC (15:00 PDT) on 20 July 2018, Rocket 1 left the Pacific Spaceport Complex – Alaska (PSCA) Launch Pad 2 for the company's first sub-orbital launch attempt. The foggy conditions made it difficult to observe the launch according to local reporters. After approximately 27 seconds of propelled flight, the vehicle suffered an anomaly and crashed into ground, within the perimeter fence of the spaceport. Following uncertainty regarding the launch, the Federal Aviation Administration (FAA) stated: "The Astra Space, Inc. launch from the Pacific Spaceport Complex Alaska at Kodiak Island on 20 July 2018 experienced a mishap. It was an FAA-licensed launch, and the agency is reviewing the event". No injuries were reported. Craig Campbell, President of Alaska Aerospace, told SpaceNews on 27 July 2018: "Our customer has requested we not discuss their operations with the press. I can confirm that a launch from the Pacific Spaceport Complex – Alaska occurred on Friday, July 20th and that the customer is very pleased with the outcome of the launch. While a post-launch team is reviewing the results of the launch, I can state that there was no material damage to our facilities as a result of this launch, we look forward to working with this customer to support their next launch from Alaska".

Rocket 2 
Rocket 2 was launched at 30 November 2018 at 03:00 UTC (20:00 PST on 29 November 2018) from Pacific Spaceport Complex – Alaska, Launch Pad 2, the same used for Rocket 1. After approximately 30 seconds of powered flight, the vehicle aborted, resulting in the vehicle falling to the ground and crashing. Sources observing the launch reported the vehicle landed slightly outside the perimeter fence, south of the launch pad, but on spaceport property.

This launch had no customer and acted as a suborbital test flight using a mass simulator for the second stage, as Aether was still in development. There was no payload on board. The mission planned to fly on an azimuth of 195° from the spaceport, but the license did not disclose the planned altitude or downrange distance for the mission. No injuries were reported.

Rocket 3 

The rocket consisted of two stages.

Rocket 3.0 

The first Rocket 3, "1 of 3" or "Rocket 3.0", completed a static fire test at Castle Airport, California. It was planned to launch from Pacific Spaceport Complex – Alaska (PSCA) with attempted launches in late February and early March 2020, with the last launch attempt on 2 March 2020, as part of the DARPA Launch Challenge. Three CubeSats for the U.S. Department of Defense and the University of South Florida, along with a space-based beacon designed to aid in space traffic management, were slated to ride into orbit on "1 of 3". On 2 March 2020, DARPA and Astra officials said the Prometheus CubeSat, the University of South Florida's two Articulated Reconnaissance and Communications Expedition (ARCE) nanosatellites, and the space-based radio beacon payload were to be removed from the rocket after the end of the Launch Challenge. Astra had failed to launch within the DARPA Launch Challenge's launch window; launch preparations continued regardless for the test flight.

On 23 March 2020, "1 of 3" was destroyed by fire during launch preparations. The incident at the Pacific Spaceport Complex on Kodiak Island occurred while Astra was detanking fuel during a pre-launch countdown dress rehearsal. A valve on Rocket 3.0 remained open. This incident was first reported by KMXT, a local public radio station. Astra CEO Chris Kemp confirmed no payloads were on-board Astra's rocket at the time of the incident.

Rocket 3.1 
A second launch attempt was planned for no earlier than 31 August 2020 at 02:00 UTC using the second Rocket 3 vehicle, Rocket 3.1 (formerly "2 of 3"), but was delayed due to unfavorable weather conditions. The next launch window began on 11 September 2020. The launch occurred on 12 September 2020 at 03:19 UTC. The launch failed during first stage flight, when Rocket 3.1 experienced an anomaly and fell back to Earth shortly after, and exploded on impact in a part of the spaceport that was cleared of personnel before launch. However, many public viewers captured footage of the launch and failure with the rocket slamming into the ground creating an explosion and cloud. Astra officials said on 12 September 2020, a software fix will likely resolve a guidance system problem that caused the first orbital-class rocket to begin drifting off course soon after liftoff, prompting a range safety officer to terminate the flight. The result was not unexpected after Astra officials set modest goals for the test flight. The rocket carried no payload. The company said it planned a series of three test launches before it expects to reach orbit with its commercial rocket. Astra confirmed that Rocket 3.2, the third Rocket 3, was almost complete and would take flight after data review and making necessary changes.

Rocket 3.2 
On 15 December 2020 at roughly 20:55 UTC, Astra launched its third Rocket 3 vehicle, called Rocket 3.2 (formerly "3 of 3"). The rocket successfully passed the Kármán Line and reached its target orbital altitude of 390 kilometers, a first for Astra. However, due to issues with the upper stage's fuel mixture, the rocket failed to achieve orbit. The company declared the flight a success, arguing that their objective for the test flight was to achieve a successful cut-off of the first stage's main engine, which was achieved. The rocket did not carry any satellites or other payloads, as the launch was a demonstration mission.

Rocket 3.3 
On 28 August 2021 at 22:35 UTC, Astra launched its fourth Rocket 3 vehicle, Rocket 3.3 (serial number LV0006). The flight carried an instrumentation payload for the United States Space Force under the Space Test Program, and a separation of payload from the launch vehicle was not planned. Shortly after liftoff, a single engine failure caused the vehicle to begin drifting horizontally for several tens of meters off the launch pad before beginning to ascend vertically.
Not long afterwards the vehicle deviated from its FAA licensed trajectory and range safety terminated the flight at approximately T+02:28. The rocket reached a peak altitude of  before crashing into the ocean downrange of the launch site. No injuries or damage to property were reported from this incident. Astra determined a small propellant leakage from the launcher fueling system caused impacts leading to a single engine failing. This triggered the hover during liftoff and left the rocket without enough thrust to reach orbit.

On 20 November 2021, Astra's Rocket 3.3 vehicle (serial number LV0007) successfully reached orbit after launching from Pacific Spaceport Complex – Alaska (PSCA) carrying the demonstration payload STP-27AD2 (COSPAR 2021-108A, SATCAT 49494) for the United States Space Force.

On 10 February 2022, Astra Rocket LV 0008 experienced an anomaly post-launch, during stage separation. After two previous scrubbed launch attempts, ignition and launch of LV0008 occurred nominally. However, after Main Engine Cut-off the payload fairing that covers the second stage and satellites failed to separate correctly and the ignition of the second-stage occurred with the fairing still attached. The second stage punched through the fairing and spun out of control. Shortly after this anomaly the flight was terminated and the payload lost. The post-launch investigation later found that the failure was caused by an error in the wiring diagram which prevented the fairings from separating completely before second stage ignition, coupled with a software problem that resulted in the upper stage engine being unable to use its thrust vector system to correct the tumbling after stage ignition.

On 15 March 2022, Astra Rocket 3.3 vehicle (serial number LV0009) successfully reached orbit with the Astra-1 mission.

On 12 June 2022, Astra Rocket 3.3 vehicle (serial number LV0010) failed to reach orbit. The rocket's payload, two TROPICS satellites for NASA's TROPICS weather research (rainfall and hurricanes) constellation, was lost. This was the final flight of Rocket 3.

On 4 August 2022, Astra announced that since only two of Rocket 3.3's flights were successful, they will retire that vehicle and make a full transition to Rocket 4.0. They are also working with customers to get their payloads on the new launch vehicle.

Future Rocket variants

Rocket 4 
Rocket 4 is currently under development. It is going to be an upgraded variant of Rocket 3 with new higher performance first stage engines and a greater payload capacity. Astra aims to eventually achieve a weekly launch cadence with this vehicle. On 4 August 2022, Astra announced its intention to make a full transition to Rocket 4, with its maiden flight being rescheduled to no earlier than 2023.

Rocket 5 
In September 2020, Astra submitted a proposal to the Air Force's AFWERX program titled, "Responsive Launch Enabled by Astra's Rocket 5.0". Rocket 5 will be a variant of the Rocket 3 dedicated to suborbital point-to-point delivery, featuring a modified second stage between the Rocket 3's first and upper stages.

Launch history

Notes

References 

Astra (aerospace)
Space launch vehicles of the United States
Rocket launches in 2021
Rocket launches in 2022
Rocket launches in 2020
Rocket launches in 2018